Munro Price is a British historian noted for his award-winning work on French history.

Early life 
Price was born (February 1963) in London to playwright and author Stanley Price and his wife Judy ( Fenton) and raised in Highgate.

Education 
Price was educated at University College School and Cambridge University, where he gained a First Class Degree in History before going on to study for his PhD under the supervision of T. C. W. Blanning.

Price was active in politics while at Cambridge, becoming president of Cambridge University Social Democrats, the university's SDP society.

Career 
For much of his academic career Price has been based at the University of Bradford, where he is currently professor of Modern European History and director of MA Programme in the Department of Peace Studies. He has also taught at the University of Swansea and the University of Lyon.

Noted works 
Known for his writings on French history from the time of the French Revolution through to Louis Philippe, Price has published several books and articles on the period, including The Fall of the French Monarchy: Louis XVI, Marie Antoinette and the baron de Breteuil (2002), winner of the Franco-British Society's Enid McLeod Literary Prize, and Napoleon: the End of Glory (2015) which has since been translated into German.

Price has also co-authored The Road to Apocalypse: The Extraordinary Journey of Lewis Way with his father, Stanley Price, focussing on the origins of the Evangelical Christian Zionist movement in early 19th century Britain and Europe.

Media
Contributing towards television programmes focussed on his area of expertise, Price has appeared in several documentaries in English and French language.

Bibliography
Preserving the Monarchy: the comte de Vergennes. 1774-1787, (Cambridge University Press, 1995)
Louis XVI and the comte de Vergennes: correspondence, 1774-1787, with John Hardman, (Voltaire Foundation, Oxford, December 1998)
The Fall of the French Monarchy: Louis XVI, Marie Antoinette and the baron de Breteuil (Macmillan, 2002) won the Franco-British Society’s Enid McLeod Literary Prize.  It was shortlisted for the Longman-History Today Prize, and the Hessell-Tiltman Prize. 
It was published in the U.S. in 2003 with the title The Road from Versailles: Louis XVI, Marie Antoinette, and the Fall of the French Monarchy by St. Martin's Press.
It was published in Brazil in 2007 with the title A Queda da Monarquia Francesa. Luis XVI, Maria Antonieta et o barao de Breteuil. Editora Record, Rio de Janeiro.
The Perilous Crown: Ruling France 1814-1848 (Macmillan, 2007) was well received in the UK, and France where it was published as Louis-Philippe, le prince et le roi : La France entre deux révolutions (Éditions de Fallois, 2009).
The Road to Apocalypse: The Extraordinary Journey of Lewis Way (Notting Hill Editions, 2011) with Stanley Price.  This book was shortlisted for the Jewish Quarterly-Wingate Prize.
 Napoleon The End Of Glory OUP, Oxford, 2014
It was published in Germany in 2015 with the title Napoleon. Der Untergang.

References

Living people
British historians
Historians of France
People educated at University College School
Place of birth missing (living people)
Alumni of Gonville and Caius College, Cambridge
Academics of the University of Bradford
1963 births